Nirupama Rath was an Indian freedom fighter, social activist and writer. Dr Rath was one of the founding fellows of the Indian Medical Association.She served as the State IMA's president for three straight years from 1987. She took a keen interest in the Indian freedom struggle since her childhood and actively participated in the Quit India Movement in 1942.

She was deeply involved in various social services and became the Founder President of Utkla Mahila Sammilani as well as the Working Women’s Hostel.

Literary Works 
Her literary pursuits won her widespread acclaim and she was accorded the Orissa Sahitya Academy Samman in 2003. Her works ‘Prasuti Bigyan’ has been taken in as a textbook for nurses and midwives. Among her other works are ‘Bharatiya Swadhinata re Nari’, ‘Alibha Smruti’ and ‘Abhula Anubhuti’, ‘Samajik Niryatana’, ‘Masala’, ‘Nari O Bicharalaya’, ‘Diganta’, ‘Kanya and Sishu Sampada’ among others.

Awards and Honours 

 Soviet Land Nehru Award in 1972
 National Unity Award in 1993
 Suprativa and Chalapath Samman
 Orissa Sahitya Academy Samman in 2003

Death 
Dr Nirupama Rath passed away at her Dargha Bazaar residence in Odisha in 2011. She was 86 at the time of her death and is survived by two sons Dr. Jayant Rath and Rajat Rath.

Publications

References

External links 
 Dr. Nirupama Rath vs State Of Orissa on 17 January, 1996

Women Indian independence activists